His Best is a greatest hits album by Chicago blues harmonica player Little Walter, released on June 17, 1997 by MCA and Chess Records as a part of The Chess 50th Anniversary Collection (see 1997 in music). The album is seen as the CD successor to the 1958 The Best of Little Walter and features ten of the songs from that album.

Notable inclusions

Juke
"Juke" was Little Walter's first solo recording for Leonard Chess and reached #1 on the R&B Singles chart.  A harmonica instrumental, it is Walter's most famous composition.

Mean Old World
Adapted from a 1942 T-Bone Walker song, "Mean Old World" became a #6 R&B chart success for Walter.

Blues with a Feeling
Walter's rendition reached #2 on the R&B Single chart  and made the song a harmonica-blues standard.  "Blues with a Feeling" was originally recorded by Rabon Tarrant with Jack McVea and His All Stars in 1947.

My Babe
Written by Willie Dixon, "My Babe" was Walter's second #1 on the R&B Charts. It is perhaps Walter's best-known vocal performance.

Roller Coaster
The song "Roller Coaster" is an instrumental version of the 1955 Bo Diddley song "You Don't Love Me (You Don't Care)". The song reached #6 on the R&B charts.

It Ain't Right
Although "It Ain't Right" did not chart, it was later adapted by other musicians, including John Mayall & the Bluesbreakers, who recorded it as the closing track to their debut album Blues Breakers with Eric Clapton (Clapton has identified Little Walter as his favorite harmonica player).

Key to the Highway
Walter's rendition of  "Key to the Highway" reached #6 and was his second to last charting single.  His rendition became a blues standard, performed and recorded by a variety of artists. It was originally recorded by Charlie Segar in 1940.

Just Your Fool
One of Walter's later recordings, it was released in 1962.  Buddy Johnson originally recorded the song as "I'm Just Your Fool" in 1953;  in 2010, "Just Your Fool" became a popular single by Cyndi Lauper.

Track listing

Personnel
According to liner notes:

Little Walter – vocals, harmonica
Muddy Waters – guitar, slide guitar
Jimmy Rogers – guitar
Louis Myers – guitar
David Myers – guitar
Luther Tucker – guitar
Robert Lockwood Jr. – guitar
Leonard Caston – guitar on "My Babe"
Bo Diddley – guitar on "Roller Coaster"
Fred Robinson – guitar on "Just Your Fool"
Jimmie Lee Robinson – guitar on "Confessin' the Blues", bass on "Just Your Fool"
Willie Dixon – bass, production
Otis Spann – piano
Elgin Evans – drums
Fred Below – drums
George Hunter – drums on "Key to the Highway"
Billy Stepney – drums on "Everything Gonna Be Alright"
Leonard Chess – production
Phil Chess – production
Andy McKaie – reissue production, compilation
Billy Altman – liner notes, compilation
Erick Labson – digital remastering
Michael Diehl – design, typography
Mary Katherine Aldin – photography
Ray Flerlage – photography
Geary Chansley – photo research

References

Little Walter albums
Chess Records compilation albums
MCA Records compilation albums
1997 greatest hits albums